Der Proletarier ('The Proletarian') was a weekly newspaper published in Luxembourg between July 1919 and 1940. It the central organ of the Trade Union Commission of Luxembourg. It replaced the previous newspapers Die Volksstimme and Der Gewerkschaftler.

After the Second World War, Der Proletarier was replaced by Arbecht.

References

Defunct newspapers published in Luxembourg
Defunct weekly newspapers
German-language newspapers published in Luxembourg
Weekly newspapers published in Luxembourg
Newspapers established in 1919
Publications disestablished in 1940
Socialist newspapers
Trade unions in Luxembourg